Minuartia nuttallii is a species of flowering plant in the family Caryophyllaceae known by the common names Nuttall's sandwort and brittle sandwort.

It is native to western North America from southwestern Canada to California and Nevada, where it grows in several types of habitat, including rocky and barren ridges, chaparral and  woodlands, often on serpentine soils.

Description
Minuartia nuttallii  is a rhizomatous perennial herb forming low mats of glandular, hairy herbage. The thin, rigid, sometimes needlelike leaves may be just over a centimeter long but are barely a millimeter wide.

The small flowers have five white petals usually under a centimeter long and ribbed, pointed sepals.

External links
Jepson Manual Treatment
USDA Plants Profile
Flora of North America
Photo gallery

nuttallii
Flora of California
Flora of Nevada
Flora of Idaho
Flora of the West Coast of the United States
Flora of the Cascade Range
Flora of the Klamath Mountains
Flora of the Sierra Nevada (United States)
Natural history of the California Coast Ranges
Flora without expected TNC conservation status